An acrostolium is a decorative feature found on the bows of ancient Roman, Greek and other nations' galleys, in an upward-curving extension of the ship's stem, often terminating in a helmet, shield or animal motif. A precursor to ship figureheads, the acrostolium was a semi-religious object intended to draw favour from sea gods or ward off evil weather.

Versions of acrostolia were also featured in rostral columns marking notable seaborne events.

References

Watercraft components
Ancient Roman art